Candyman is a 1992 American  gothic supernatural horror film, written and directed by Bernard Rose and starring Virginia Madsen, Tony Todd, Xander Berkeley, Kasi Lemmons, and Vanessa E. Williams. Based on Clive Barker's short story "The Forbidden", the film follows a Chicago graduate student completing a thesis on urban legends and folklore, which leads her to the legend of the "Candyman", the ghost of an African-American artist and the son of a slave who was murdered in the late 19th century for his relationship with the daughter of a wealthy white man.

The film came to fruition after a chance meeting between Rose and Barker who recently completed his own film adaptation of Nightbreed (1990). Rose expressed interest in Barker's story "The Forbidden", and Barker agreed to license the rights. Where Barker's story revolved around the themes of the British class system in contemporary Liverpool, Rose chose to refit the story to Cabrini-Green's public housing development in Chicago and instead focus on the themes of race and social class in the inner-city United States.

Candyman was theatrically released on October 16, 1992 by TriStar Pictures and PolyGram Filmed Entertainment. The film received generally positive reviews and grossed over $25 million in the US, where it was also regarded in some critical circles as a contemporary classic of horror cinema. It was followed by two sequels, Candyman: Farewell to the Flesh (1995) and Candyman: Day of the Dead (1999).  A direct sequel of the same name was released on August 27, 2021.

Plot
Helen Lyle is a semiotics  graduate student at the  University of Illinois Chicago. While researching urban legends, she learns of the Candyman, a spirit who kills anyone who speaks his name five times in front of a mirror. She learns of a recent murder at the Cabrini–Green Homes public housing project and two dozen others that have been attributed by locals to the Candyman. Skeptical, Helen and her friend Bernadette Walsh repeat the Candyman's name to Helen's bathroom mirror, but nothing happens.

Helen and Bernadette work together on a thesis on how Cabrini-Green residents use the Candyman legend to cope with hardship and inequality. She and Bernadette visit the scene of the most recent murder, where Helen discovers a room where offerings have been left for the Candyman. Afterwards they interview the victim's neighbor, Anne-Marie McCoy, a single mother raising her infant son Anthony. Helen and her husband Trevor later have dinner with an expert on the Candyman legend, who says that "the Candyman" was Daniel Robitaille, an African-American man born in the late 1800s as the son of a slave, and who grew up to become a well-known painter. After he fell in love with and impregnated a white woman, her father sent a lynch mob after him. The mob cut off his right hand and smeared him with honeycomb stolen from an apiary, attracting bees that stung him to death. His corpse was burned in a pyre erected on the site where the Cabrini-Green Homes were eventually built.

When Helen returns to Cabrini-Green, a young boy named Jake tells her of an incident where a developmentally disabled boy was violently castrated by Candyman in a public bathroom. She goes to investigate, where a man calling himself the Candyman attacks her. She identifies her attacker, who in reality is the head of a local gang, to the police; he is charged for the murders attributed to the Candyman. The real Candyman appears to Helen in a parking garage and hypnotizes her. He explains that because she has discredited his legend, he must shed innocent blood to perpetuate it. Helen blacks out and awakens in Anne-Marie's apartment, covered in blood, to find Anne-Marie's pet Rottweiler, Annie, decapitated and her son Anthony kidnapped. The police arrive and arrest Helen.

After Trevor bails her out of jail, Helen finds the Candyman in a photograph she took at Cabrini-Green. He appears inside Helen's apartment and cuts her neck, causing her to bleed and pass out. Bernadette arrives at Helen's apartment, and when Helen comes to, she sees that the Candyman has murdered Bernadette. Framed for the crime, Helen is committed to a psychiatric hospital. While being interviewed in preparation for her trial a month later, Helen attempts to prove her innocence by summoning the Candyman, who appears and murders her psychiatrist. Candyman then frees Helen from her restraints, allowing her to escape.

She returns to her apartment to find Trevor now living with one of his students. Helen confronts him, then flees to Cabrini-Green to rescue Anthony. When she finds the Candyman in his lair, he tells her that surrendering to him will ensure Anthony's safety. Offering Helen immortality, the Candyman opens his coat, revealing a ribcage wreathed in bees. The bees pour out of his mouth as he kisses her and stream down her throat. He vanishes with Anthony, and Helen awakes to discover a mural of the Candyman and his lover, who bears a striking resemblance to her.

The Candyman promises to release Anthony if Helen helps him strike fear into Cabrini-Green's residents. Attempting to feed his legend, the Candyman reneges and attempts to immolate both Helen and Anthony in a pyre. The flames destroy the Candyman, and Helen dies while saving Anthony. The residents, led by Anne-Marie and Jake, pay their respects at Helen's funeral. At home, the grief-stricken and guilt-ridden Trevor looks into the mirror and says Helen's name five times, whereupon Helen's vengeful spirit appears and kills him. A new mural of Helen dressed in white with her hair ablaze appears in the Candyman's lair.

Cast

Production

Barker's short story, set in his native Liverpool, was about segregation and the culture of the poor urban areas. For Candyman, Rose was so shocked by Chicago's "dynamic" architecture and large amount of prejudice that he decided to change the Liverpool location to Chicago. Assisted by members of the Illinois Film Commission, Rose scouted locations in Chicago and found Cabrini-Green, a housing project notorious for its poor construction, violence and high robbery rates. The project was also located in between high-class neighborhoods, meaning that the character of Helen could feel Cabrini-Green's chaos from a safe apartment not too far away. This Americanization of the story turned Candyman into an interracial love story where the ghetto residents are now victims of the titular killer. With this change, Rose wanted to showcase those that are living in the poor neighborhoods as regular human beings that are trying to get by which is why he avoided tropes that are common in most American ghetto stories such as gangs and drugs. According to journalist Steve Bogira, one source of inspiration may have been a pair of articles that he wrote for the Chicago Reader in 1987 and 1990 about the murder of Ruthie Mae McCoy, a resident of Chicago's Abbot Homes housing project. In 1987, McCoy was killed by an intruder who entered her apartment through an opening behind the bathroom's medicine cabinet.

Rose's screenplay garnered a huge amount of attention in the casting agencies and Virginia Madsen and Tony Todd instantly tried to get parts to have a chance to work with the filmmaker. Eddie Murphy was the original choice for the role of Candyman, but the filmmakers could not afford him. Todd, who was fit for playing the killer as he was six-foot-five and physically fit, recalled that there was skepticism from his colleagues about him playing the Candyman due to the number of bee sting injuries that he would have to receive. He persisted as he wanted to work with the director and said, "I've always wanted to find my own personal Phantom of the Opera." While the Candyman's background is unknown in the original story, Todd came up with the backstory for the character in the film. Virginia Madsen was friends with Rose and his then-wife, Alexandra Pigg and Madsen was originally to play the role of Helen's friend, Bernie while Pigg was to play Helen. The choice was made to make the character of Bernie Black American so Madsen lost the part. As the shooting was about to commence, Pigg discovered that she was pregnant so the role of Helen was offered to Madsen. Had Madsen been unable to step into the role, producer Alan Poul was partial to Sandra Bullock as Helen.

Three days of Candyman's filming was spent on Cabrini-Green while the other days were spent in scenes on Hollywood sound stages. With plainclothes law enforcement by their side, Todd and Madsen went into the buildings of Cabrini-Green as part of researching their roles which was a useful, but distressing experience for both actors. For playing the Candyman, Todd tried to act as a "primeval boogeyman" without overacting the part which was tricky to do. He worked with Bob Keen on the Candyman's look. Keen first had Todd wear a machine-controlled fake right arm, but found the movements of the arm too strict. Then, Keen came up with the idea of having Todd wear a hook to indicate the Candyman's supernatural being. He spent three hours making the hook. Todd suggested the character to wear an eyepatch, but Keen rejected the idea. To keep Candyman at a low budget, Rose instructed a special effects manager named Martin Bresson to use traditional effects instead of optical effects. The same team who worked on Backdraft also designed the set for the bonfire scene of Candyman which involved using 1,500 gallons of propane and its largest section having a 70-foot width and 30-foot height.

The honeybees in Candyman were controlled by Norman Gary who previously handled the bees on films such as The Deadly Bees (1966), My Girl (1991) and Fried Green Tomatoes (1991). The film used more than 200,000 real honeybees throughout and most of the crew wore bodysuits to be protected from stings, although all of them faced at least one sting. Todd negotiated a bonus of $1,000 for each of the 23 bee stings that he received during filming. In shooting the film's climax where the Candyman sends 500 bees into Helen's face, he first had the bees placed in his mouth by using a protective mouthpiece to avoid as many stings as possible. Gary had to use freshly hatched, non-stinging and non-flying bees for the scene as Madsen was very allergic to stings. It took half an hour for all of the bees to get into Todd's mouth and he recalled being "tranced out" when he let all of the bees out of his mouth. Rose also utilized hypnosis in his movie to work around what he saw as the cliche of excessive screaming in the horror films. Bernard Rose came up with the idea to have Virginia Madsen hypnotized in the scenes where she confronted the Candyman. According to Todd, this process would occur prior to filming the scenes where he and Madsen interacted and would take roughly ten minutes to prepare. This was accomplished through the use of a professional hypnotist who established a key word that Rose would use to put Madsen under a trancelike state.

Music
The film's score was composed by Philip Glass. According to Glass, "It has become a classic so I still make money from that score, get checks every year." A limited edition featuring 7500 copies of the film's soundtrack was released in February 2015.

Release

Theatrical
Candyman had its world premiere at the 1992 Toronto International Film Festival, playing as part of its Midnight Madness line-up. It was released on October 16, 1992 in the United States where it made $25.7 million.

Home media
It was released on home video in February 1993 by Columbia TriStar Home Video. A special edition DVD was released in August 2004.

Candyman was first released on Blu-ray format in Australia on September 1, 2011 via Universal Studios Home Entertainment. The same Blu-ray version was made available in the United Kingdom on October 10, 2011. The set contains DTS-HD Master Audio 2.0 for its original English track as well as standard DTS 2.0 surround for its additional French, Italian, Japanese and Spanish tracks with multiple subtitle options including English SDH and no special features. The film was released again in Australia from Shock Records via their Cinema Cult subsidiary with the only addition being a slipcover. In Germany, a "Limited Edition" Digibook was made available on May 27, 2016 and was, at the time, the most definitive Blu-ray edition to date. It contains both German and English DTS-HD Master Audio 2.0, German and English subtitles and special features including audio commentary, featurettes, storyboards and original trailer. A standard edition set was released in Germany on July 29, 2016. Several standard Blu-ray editions eventually became available in France, Italy, Spain, Japan, Denmark, Finland and Sweden throughout 2011 and 2012.

On July 20, 2018, it was announced that Candyman would be released on Blu-ray in a "Collector's Edition" on November 20, 2018 in the United States via Scream Factory, a subsidiary of Shout! Factory. The set contains a newly remastered 2K restoration from a new 4K scan as well as a number of new special features including an unrated cut, commentaries and featurettes. The following week, on July 27, 2018, Arrow Films announced a "Limited Edition" Blu-ray set in the United Kingdom which includes the same scan and special features as the Scream Factory edition. It was confirmed for this edition that the film would contain a new DTS-HD Master Audio 5.1 track for the first time. The set includes a collector's booklet, six lobby cards, a reversible poster and reversible cover artwork. It was released on October 29, 2018.

Arrow issued a limited edition of Candyman on 4K Ultra HD Blu-ray in the UK on May 23, 2022. It features a new 4K restoration from the original negative, both the US R-rated version and the original UK theatrical version featuring alternate footage, two booklets, six UK lobby card reproductions and a poster. Scream Factory also issued a 4K edition in the United States and Canada on May 24.

Controversy
There was some controversy that the film was depicting racism and racial stereotypes. According to Rose, "I had to go and have a whole set of meetings with the NAACP because the producers were so worried and what they said to me when they'd read the script was 'Why are we even having this meeting? You know, this is just good fun.' Their argument was 'Why shouldn't a black actor be a ghost? Why shouldn't a black actor play Freddy Krueger or Hannibal Lecter? If you're saying that they can't be, it's really perverse. This is a horror movie.'" At the time of the film's release, Madsen said, "I was and am now worried about how people will respond. I don't think Spike Lee will like this film."

Reception

Critical response
On the review aggregator website Rotten Tomatoes, Candyman holds an approval rating of 79% based on 80 reviews and an average rating of 6.70/10. The site's critics consensus reads: "Though it ultimately sacrifices some mystery in the name of gory thrills, Candyman is a nuanced, effectively chilling tale that benefits from an interesting premise and some fine performances." On Metacritic, the film has a weighted average score of 61 out of 100, based on 15 critics, indicating "generally favorable reviews". Audiences polled by CinemaScore gave the film an average grade of "C+" on an A+ to F scale.

Allmovie praised the film, calling it "haunting, intelligent and poetic" and "the finest Barker adaptation ever committed to film". Roger Ebert of the Chicago Sun-Times wrote, "Elements of the plot may not hold up in the clear light of day, but that didn't bother me much. What I liked was a horror movie that was scaring me with ideas and gore, instead of simply with gore." Janet Maslin of The New York Times compared it to "an elaborate campfire story" with an "unusually high interest in social issues". Kevin Thomas of the Los Angeles Times called the film Clive Barker's "worst to date"—an ambitious, but pretentious film that "quickly becomes as repellent as it is preposterous." Variety called it "an upper-register horror item that delivers the requisite shocks and gore, but doesn't cheat or cop out."

In a review for Channel 4 Candyman has been called "atmospheric and visually stimulating enough to satisfy gore-hounds", as well as an "intelligent social commentary". Slant Magazine'''s Eric Henderson positively reviewed both the eponymous character and the leading actor: "Played by Tony Todd (and his velvety basso profundo voice), the Candyman is a svelte, sexual monument, far removed from the silent brutality of your average serial slasher."

Accolades

Legacy
The film came in at number 75 on Bravo's 100 Scariest Movie Moments. The character Candyman came in at number 8 on Bloody Disgusting's "The Top 13 Slashers in Horror Movie History" and ranked the same on Ugo's "Top Eleven Slashers". The actor who played Candyman, Tony Todd, made #53 on Retrocrush's "The 100 Greatest Horror Movie Performances" for his role.

The film appears in two sections of Filmsite.org's "Greatest Scariest Movie Moments and Scenes" and "Greatest Movie Twists, Spoilers and Surprise Endings". In 2001, the American Film Institute nominated this film for AFI's 100 Years...100 Thrills. South Park parodied this film in the season 10 episode "Hell on Earth 2006", in which The Notorious B.I.G. appears whenever someone says "Biggie Smalls" three times in a mirror.

Sequels
Two stand-alone sequels comprising a single storyline were released in 1995 and 1999 respectively: Candyman: Farewell to the Flesh and Candyman: Day of the Dead. Originally, Bernard Rose wanted to make a prequel film about Candyman and Helen's love but the studio turned it down.

In September 2018, it was announced that Jordan Peele was in talks to produce a direct sequel to the 1992 film using his company, Monkeypaw Productions. Todd stated in a 2018 interview with Nightmare on Film Street, "I'd rather have [Peele] do it, someone with intelligence who's going to be thoughtful and dig into the whole racial makeup of who Candyman is and why he existed in the first place." In November 2018, it was confirmed that Peele would produce the film with Universal and MGM and will partner with Win Rosenfeld to co-produce the film while Nia DaCosta signed on as director. The film will serve as a sequel, taking place back in the new gentrified Cabrini-Green where the old housing projects development once stood in Chicago. Filming was due to commence in spring 2019. In an interview with Entertainment Weekly, Todd spoke of Peele, stating: "I know he's a fan. I'm hoping I will appear in the film in some form of fashion. Wouldn't that make sense? But, it's Hollywood so I won't take it personally if for some reason it doesn't work out." He added, "If this new one is successful, it will shed light back on the original. I think the subject matter is more important than any individuals and I mean that."

In February 2019, Yahya Abdul-Mateen II was in talks to play the titular character. In response to the news, Todd said: "Cheers to Candyman, a wonderful character that I've lived with for 25 years. He's brought grace and glory and a beautiful boatload of friends & family. I'm honored that the spirit of Daniel Robitaille & Cabrini-Green rises again. Truth to power! Blessings to the cast & crew". However, it was ultimately announced that Todd would reprise his role, while Adbul-Mateen would portray the adult version of Anthony McCoy. Teyonah Parris was cast opposite in playing Anthony's girlfriend. Other added cast are Colman Domingo and Nathan Stewart-Jarret. Vanessa Estelle Williams would also reprise her role as Anne-Marie, Anthony's mother.

Production for the film began in August 2019 and wrapped in September 2019 in Chicago, Illinois. The working title of the film was revealed on some of the cast and crew social media pages as Say My Name which was discreetly used in the revised scripts and production sets to keep things "flying under the radar" with the official title also being Candyman''. The film was released on August 27, 2021.

References

Sources

External links
 
 

1992 films
1992 horror films
1990s ghost films
1990s supernatural horror films
American ghost films
American supernatural horror films
1990s English-language films
Films set in apartment buildings
Films set in Chicago
Films shot in Chicago
Films based on short fiction
Films based on urban legends
Hood films
PolyGram Filmed Entertainment films
TriStar Pictures films
Films based on works by Clive Barker
Films directed by Bernard Rose (director)
Films produced by Steve Golin
Films scored by Philip Glass
African-American horror films
African-American films
Candyman (film series)
Films about hypnosis
Films with screenplays by Bernard Rose (director)
Films about race and ethnicity
Films about racism in the United States
1990s American films